is a song by Japanese pop singer Eir Aoi. It was released digitally on April 22, 2018, and received a physical release together with the song "Yakusoku" on June 13, 2018 as her fourteenth single. It reached number 8 on Oricon and number 10 on Japan Hot 100. It was used as the opening theme song of anime series Sword Art Online Alternative Gun Gale Online. The single also mark her return from her hiatus, and also mark as her first double A-side single.

Release and reception
On 8 February 2018, it was announced that she would resume her activities after her hiatus with the release of the music video  on YouTube. This was confirmed on 7 March 2018 that her next release would be the opening theme to anime Sword Art Online Alternative Gun Gale Online, titled . The song was released digitally on April 22, 2018, and received a physical release together with the song "Yakusoku" on June 13, 2018 as her fourteenth single on three edition; Regular edition, Limited edition and Limited anime edition. The single reached number 8 on Oricon, 10 on Japan Hot 100, and 1 on Japan Hot Animation with spent 10, 20 and 13 weeks respectively. In June 2018, "Ryūsei" was certified gold by the Recording Industry Association of Japan (RIAJ) for 100,000 full-track ringtone digital music downloads (Chaku Uta Full). The song placed in 6th on Newtype Anime Awards for 2018 best theme song, The song was featured in her fourth album "Fragment".

Music video
The music video for "Ryūsei" was directed by Takashi Tadokoro.  The video features a girl with school uniform that was writing in her notebook on some school. After she finish writing, she torn a page that she was writing before and start to cry (it is revealed that she is writing a word "meteor", indicating that she want to see a meteor). Some scene featuring the girl running from her school to some place where the meteor and star can be seen. The video also feature Eir Aoi singing in the music studio. The video end when the girl finally can see a meteor on sky with the view of the city, smiling as the meteor faded away.

Track listing

Regular edition

Limited edition

Limited anime edition

Personnel
Singer and bands
Eir Aoi – vocals, lyrics ("Ryūsei", "Yakusoku")
Kohei Tsunami, Ryosuke Shigenaga, Katsuhiko Kurosu – lyrics 
Kohei Tsunami – bass, arranger, other instruments
Takumi Sone – guitar

Production
Satoshi Morishige – record
Kenichi Koga – mixer

Charts

Certifications

Release history

Awards and nominations

References

Eir Aoi songs
2018 singles
Anime songs
2018 songs